Érik Orsenna is the pen-name of Érik Arnoult (born 22 March 1947) a French politician and novelist. After studying philosophy and political science at the Institut d'Études Politiques de Paris ("Sciences Po"), Orsenna specialized in economics at the London School of Economics. He was a close collaborator of François Mitterrand and held several government positions in the 1980s and 1990s. He is a member (currently on leave) of the Conseil d'État, having been appointed in 1985. He was elected to the Académie Française on 28 May 1998. He won the 1990 International Nonino Prize in Italy.
For Voyage au pays du coton he received the second prize of the Lettre Ulysses Award in 2006.

Bibliography
1973  Loyola's blues  (Le Seuil)
1977  La Vie comme à Lausanne  (Le Seuil)
1977  Espace national et déséquilibre monétaire, under his real name Érik Arnoult  (PUF)
1980  Une comédie française  (Le Seuil)
1988  L'Exposition coloniale  (Le Seuil)
1992  Besoin d'Afrique, in collaboration with Éric Fottorino and Christophe Guillemin  (Fayard)
1993  Grand amour  (Le Seuil)
1996  Histoire du monde en neuf guitares, with Thierry Arnoult  (Le Seuil)
1996  Mésaventures du Paradis, mélodie cubaine, in collaboration with Bernard Matussière  (Le Seuil)
1997  Deux étés  (Fayard)
1998  Longtemps  (Fayard)
2000  Portrait d'un homme heureux : André Le Nôtre  (Fayard)
2001  La grammaire est une chanson douce  (Stock)
2003  Madame Bâ  (Fayard)
2004  Les Chevaliers du subjonctif  (Stock)
2005  Dernières nouvelles des oiseaux  (Stock)
2005  Portrait du Gulf Stream. Éloge des courants : promenade  (Le Seuil)
2006  Voyage aux pays du coton. Petit précis de mondialisation  (Fayard)
2006  Salut au Grand Sud, in collaboration with Isabelle Autissier  (Stock)
2007  La Révolte des accents  (Stock)
2007  Le Facteur et le Cachalot  (Les Rois Mages)
2008  La Chanson de Charles Quint  (Stock)
2008  L'Avenir de l'eau  (Bonjour,Stock)
2009  Et si on dansait ?  (Stock)
2010  L'Entreprise des Indes  (Stock)
2010  Princesse Histamine  (Stock)

External links
  L'Académie française biography
  Personal website

1947 births
Living people
Writers from Paris
20th-century French novelists
21st-century French novelists
French politicians
20th-century travel writers
French travel writers
Sciences Po alumni
Alumni of the London School of Economics
Members of the Académie Française
Joseph Kessel Prize recipients
Prix Goncourt winners
Roger Nimier Prize winners
Prix Goncourt des lycéens winners
French male novelists
20th-century French male writers
21st-century French male writers
French male non-fiction writers